Michael Sperr (born 8 September 1962) is a German bobsledder. He competed in the two man and the four man events at the 1988 Winter Olympics.

References

External links
 

1962 births
Living people
German male bobsledders
Olympic bobsledders of West Germany
Bobsledders at the 1988 Winter Olympics
Sportspeople from Munich